Santa María del Mercadillo is a municipality and town located in the province of Burgos, Castile and León, Spain. According to the 2004 census (INE), the municipality had a population of 167 inhabitants.

References

Municipalities in the Province of Burgos